Sanye  may be any of several Cushitic languages spoken by former hunter-gatherers in Kenya:

Aweer language
Dahalo language
Waata language

The "Sanye" in Greenberg is Dahalo.